The 2008 British GT season was the 16th season of the British GT Championship. This was the first season with the new GT4 category, replacing the GTC category of previous years. Both championships were won at the Brands Hatch meeting in July, with Matt Nicoll-Jones and Stewart Linn securing the inaugural GT4 title in round 11, with James Gornall and Jon Barnes clinching the GT3 title, the following day in round 12.

Rule changes
 All cars run on an Avon Tyres soft compound tyre, instead of having the option of a medium compound in 2007.

Entry list
A total of twenty seven full season entries were announced on 6 March 2008.

Calendar
A provisional 14-race calendar was announced on 15 October 2007.

Standings
 Competitors must have completed 70% of the race distance covered by the class winner to be classified.
Points were awarded as follows:

GT3

GT4

References

External links
British GT website
British GT 2008 Gallery

GT
British GT Championship seasons